(born 22 July 1983) is an English actress and singer, best known for playing Debbie Dean in the Channel 4 soap opera Hollyoaks, as a member of Simon Cowell's British girl group Girl Thing, and as a member of Irish girl group Wonderland.

Early life
Jodi Albert attended the independent, Sylvia Young Theatre School, and shared lessons with Lee Ryan, Matt Willis, Billie Piper and Amy Winehouse. At the age of ten, she was cast in the starring role of Young Cosette in Les Misérables at London's Palace Theatre.

Jodi signed her first recording contract at age 15 years old to Simon Cowell's group Girl Thing. They had a top ten hit and their album went gold in Asia and Australia. Girl Thing subsequently reunited for the second series of The Big Reunion.

In 2002, Albert joined the cast of the soap opera Hollyoaks on Channel 4, playing Debbie Dean. She left in 2005, but returned for guest appearances in 2005 and 2006. In 2005, Albert won the British Soap Award for Sexiest female for her role in Hollyoaks. After leaving Hollyoaks, she appeared in Five sitcom Respectable; Casualty and The Inspector Lynley Mysteries for the BBC; and the British film Popcorn, opposite ex-EastEnders star Jack Ryder.

In 2008 Albert signed her second record deal became part of the Irish-based girlgroup Wonderland, who wrote and help create their successful Uk top 10 Album wonderland,she was heavily involved in the creative part of this band formed with Kian Egan, in partnership with music manager Louis Walsh.

Albert has posed for numerous photoshoots for several men's magazines including Maxim and FHM and is featured in Maxim's 'Girls of Maxim' gallery, also being named three times in FHM 100 Sexiest Women list: #93 in 2003; No. 73 in 2004; and No. 65 in 2005.

Personal life
Albert married Kian Egan, member of the Irish vocal group  Westlife, on 9 May 2009, in Barbados.
 On 31 July 2011 the couple announced they were expecting their first baby. The birth of their son, Koa, was announced on 20 December 2011. In November 2014, it was announced that they were expecting their second child.
In February 2015 her mother Eileen died suffering from cancer for eight years. On 21 May 2015 Albert gave birth to her second child, a son named Zekey. On 30 March 2017 Jodi announced on her Instagram that they were expecting their third child. Their third son Cobi Egan was born 29 September 2017.

Filmography

Songwriting credits
"Air Brush"
"Believe"
"Bounce"
"Don't Look Down"
"Getting Mad Not Even"
"Girl Thing"
"Girlfriend"
"If That's What It Takes"
"Last Goodbye"
"Last One Standing"
"Like Ya Like It"
"Not a Love Song"
"Signs"
"That's The Way We Do It"
"Time Has Run Out"
"One for the Summer"

Demo
"La Dolce Vita"

Cameo appearance
Westlife – "Us Against the World"

References

External links

1983 births
Living people
People from Chingford
Alumni of the Sylvia Young Theatre School
English women singers
English musical theatre actresses
English stage actresses
English soap opera actresses
English television actresses
21st-century English actresses
Actresses from London